NGG may refer to:
 Food, Beverages and Catering Union, a trade union in Germany
 New Great Game